Alex Law Kai-Yui (19 August 1952 – 2 July 2022) was a Hong Kong film director, screenwriter, and producer.

Law was educated at the Diocesan Boys' School, Hong Kong, matriculating in 1971. Law collaborated with Mabel Cheung on many of her most famous films, including the "Migration Trilogy": Illegal Immigrant (1985), An Autumn's Tale (1987) and Eight Taels of Gold (1989). He wrote the screenplay for Cheung's The Soong Sisters (1997).

Awards and nominations

External links

Alex LAW Kai-Yui
HK film director: Echoes of the Rainbow

1952 births
2022 deaths
Hong Kong film directors
Hong Kong screenwriters
Alumni of the University of Hong Kong
New York University alumni
Hong Kong people
People from Jieyang